Mukkoottuthara Thiruvambadi SreeKrishna  Swami temple is a traditional Kerala-style Hindu shrine located near Mukkoottuthara in Erumely panchayath, Kottayam district. Sree Krishna swami is the presiding primary deity here. Other sub deities are Naga, Ayyappa, and Devi. The temple is situated few meters away from the town and also an important landmark of Mukkoottuthara. The thiruutsavam is hosted from 3-8 February, ending with the Aarattu ceremony. Various rituals are also associated with the festival. The idol of deity is taken out of the temple for ritual bathing on the aarattu day. Ghoshayathra with fireworks and Chendamelam is also an important event during the festival. Many devotees arrive at the temple to join the festivities.

See also
Mukkoottuthara

References

Hindu temples in Kottayam district